Jesús Alberto Lugo Limpio is a footballer from Venezuela who plays as an attacking midfielder for Zulia F.C. and can play with either foot.

Club career

Aragua FC
Lugo has been with Aragua FC since the 2008–09 season. In the 2009–10 season, he won the Youth of the Year award from the First Division of Venezuela. His first ever goal for Aragua FC came against Monagas in a 2–2 draw on 16 August 2009, a week later he bagged the winning goal against Mineros de Guayana (1–0), he then got both goals in a 2–1 win over Atlético El Vigía on 12 September 2009. On 8 November 2009 he scored an injury time (92nd minute) equaliser against Estudiantes de Mérida. Lugo scored in a 3–1 away loss to Trujillanos FC on 17 January 2010, he scored in the 3rd minute in a 3–2 away win against Real Esppor on 25 April 2010. He scored a 79th-minute winner (2–1) against Zamora away from home on 11 August 2010, that made it 8 goals in 7 games for the attacking midfielder, drawing a blank in his next two games he went on to score against Caroní in a 2–0 win on 12 September 2010,and again on 3 October 2010 against Anzoátegui (4–2 away win). Lugo scored his first goal of the 2011–12 season against Zulia in a 3–1 away win on 11 February 2012. His second of the season came against Zamora in a 2–1 home win on 10 March 2012. He scored his third against Mineros de Guayana in a 2–2 draw away from home on 1 April 2012, and his fourth came against Trujillanos on 6 May 2012 in a 2–1 defeat, also away.

International career
On 7 August 2011 Lugo made his full debut starting and playing for 63 minutes against El Salvador losing the match 2–1, on 11 August 2011 he came on in the 73rd minute against Honduras, losing 2–0.

Club statistics

International statistics

References

External links
 
Footmercato.net

1991 births
Living people
Venezuelan footballers
Association football midfielders
Venezuela international footballers
Aragua FC players
Deportivo La Guaira players
Zulia F.C. players
Venezuelan Primera División players
People from Villa de Cura